The  is a Japanese railway line which runs between  and  stations in the cities of Niigata and Shibata in Niigata Prefecture. It is part of the East Japan Railway Company (JR East) network.

Basic data
Operators, distances:
 East Japan Railway Company (JR East) (Services and tracks)
Niigata – Shibata: 
 Japan Freight Railway Company (JR Freight) (Services only)
Kami-Nuttari Junction – Shibata: 
Double-tracking: Niigata – Niizaki
Railway signalling: ATS-Ps

Services

Limited express, Rapid
, the following services are operated.

Local
Niigata - : every 20 minutes
Toyosaka - Shibata: every 60 minutes (every 20 minutes during peaks)

Station list
 All stations are located in Niigata Prefecture.

Symbols: 
 ◇ - Single-track; station where trains can pass
 ^ - Double-track section starts from this point 
 ∥ - Double-track
 ∨ - Single-track section starts from this point

Rolling stock

Present
 E129 series 2/4-car EMUs (since December 2014)
 E653 series 7-car EMUs (Inaho limited express, since September 2013)

Former
 115 series 2/3/4-car EMUs (until March 2018)
 E127 series 2-car EMUs (until March 2015)
 485 series 6-car EMUs (Inaho, until July 2014)
 165 series
 70 series

History
The first section opened on 23 December 1952 was the 12.3 km line between Shibata Station and Kuzutsuka Station (now Toyosaka Station). On 15 April 1956, the line was extended 14.9 km from Kuzutsuka to Niigata.

The line was electrified at 1,500 V DC in 1972, and double-tracked in sections between 1978 and 1981.

References

External links

 Stations of the Hakushin Line (JR East) 

 
Lines of East Japan Railway Company
Rail transport in Niigata Prefecture
Railway lines opened in 1952
1067 mm gauge railways in Japan